Tollatsch is a German dessert from the region of Pomerania.
It is made of flour, sugar, a blend of Lebkuchen spices, bread crumbs, almonds, and raisins.

Tollatsch also contains the uncommon ingredients pork blood and Griebenschmalz (schmaltz with gribenes). The dough is cooked in meat broth.

See also
 List of desserts

References 
 Pandikow, B.: Tollatsch und Schlabuffersuppe. Erinnerungen an Tribsees.
 Fallada, H.: Das Wunder des Tollatsch.

German desserts
Pomerania